Cataclysme riguata is a moth of the family Geometridae. It is found from the  Iberian Peninsula through western and central Europe to the mountains of Central Asia.

The wingspan is about 20–23 mm. Adults are on wing from the end of April to the beginning of June and again from July to August in two generations per year.

The larvae feed on Asperula cynanchica, Bellis perennis and Galium. The species overwinters as a pupa.

References

External links

Biolib
Moths and Butterflies of Europe and North Africa
Lepiforum.de
schmetterlinge-deutschlands.de

Moths described in 1813
Cataclysmiini
Moths of Europe
Moths of Asia
Taxa named by Jacob Hübner